Boishakhi Television, (referring to the first month of the Bengali calendar) also known as Boishakhi TV, stylized as boishakhi tv, is a Bangladeshi Bengali-language privately owned satellite and cable television channel, headquartered in Mohakhali, Dhaka.

It is owned by Destiny 2000 Group, which had acquired the channel from BNS Group of Companies in the late 2000s. It officially commenced transmissions on 27 December 2005. The programming of Boishakhi Television primarily consists of entertainment programming.

History
On 9 September 2004, Boishakhi Television applied for a broadcasting license, which the Bangladesh Telecommunication Regulatory Commission granted them on 31 January 2005, the same day when Channel 1 and Banglavision have also received their licenses. The channel officially began broadcasting on 27 December 2005, being among the other private television channels in Bangladesh, which are Banglavision, RTV, Channel 1, and NTV, to be launched after the closure of Ekushey Television in 2002.

In 2007 or 2008, Destiny 2000 Limited acquired the channel from BNS Group of Companies. However, MNH Bulu, the chairman of the company, accused Destiny for forcibly taking ownership of the channel and threatened to take legal action if they did not return it to them. He filed a lawsuit against the company in 2009, but was not handed back over to them.

On 28 July 2010, Boishakhi Television rebranded and changed its logo. In May 2011, Boishakhi Television's headquarters in Mohakhali caught on fire, disrupting its transmissions at that time. In November 2011, Boishakhi Television, along with three other Bangladeshi television channels, signed an agreement with UNICEF to air children's programming for one minute.

On the World Environment Day in 2013, Boishakhi Television broadcast Dhakaye Thaki, a documentary showcasing the environmental pollution of Dhaka, the capital of Bangladesh. On 15 February 2017, the Appellate Division of the Supreme Court of Bangladesh granted Destiny 2000's appeal to own Boishakhi Television. On 26 March 2017, in observance of the Bangladeshi independence day, the channel aired 1997 film Hangor Nodi Grenade, which won the 22nd Bangladesh National Film Awards. 

In December 2018, Boishakhi Television began broadcasting using the Bangabandhu-1 satellite. Boishakhi Television became the first Bangladeshi television channel to hire a transgender news reporter on the International Women’s Day of 2021. Boishakhi Television began high definition broadcasts on 26 March 2022, coinciding the Bangladeshi independence day.

Programming

Non-scripted programming 
 Anyarakam
 Boishakhi Folk
 Golden Song
 Islam O Sundor Jibon
 Sorasori Doctor
 Shubho Shokal

Drama
 Bou Shashuri
 Comedy 420
 Dour The Trendy
 Fourth Class Society
 Jomidar Bari
 Mohajon
 Party Girl
 Pathorer Kanna
 Sonar Horin
 Taal Betaal

References

External links
 Live streaming

Television channels in Bangladesh
Mass media in Dhaka
Television channels and stations established in 2005
2005 establishments in Bangladesh